Sarah Lafferty is an American costume designer, puppeteer and performing artist.

References

External links
 Sarah Lafferty on EmmyOnline
 

Living people
Emmy Award winners
American performance artists
Year of birth missing (living people)